Microhyla maculifera (common name: Sabah rice frog) is a species of frog in the family Microhylidae. It is endemic to Borneo, specifically to the Danum Valley Conservation Area in Sabah, Malaysia.
It inhabits leaf litter on the forest floor and presumably breeds in small rain pools. Its habitat is well protected in the Danum Valley Conservation Area, but its small range makes it vulnerable to chance events.

References

maculifera
Endemic fauna of Borneo
Endemic fauna of Malaysia
Amphibians of Malaysia
Taxonomy articles created by Polbot
Amphibians described in 1989
Amphibians of Borneo